Phillip D. Bissett (born September 11, 1956), was a member of the Maryland House of Delegates, District 30 in Anne Arundel County and is a former Republican candidate for Anne Arundel County Executive.

Background
Bissett was appointed to replace the late Aris T. Allen in the Maryland House of Delegates in 1991. He served until 1999 when he was defeated by C. Richard D'Amato for his seat in Anne Arundel County's District 30.

Education
Bissett attended Southern High School.  After high school he attended Anne Arundel Community College.

Career
Bissett has been active in the Republican Party for many years.  Prior to serving as State Delegate in the Maryland House of Delegates, he was a member of the County Executive's Transition Team for Anne Arundel County in 1990. He has also served on the State Commission on the Capital City and the South County Environmental Commission.

While a member of the House of Delegates, Bissett served on several committees including: the Judiciary Committee from 1991 until 1999 and the Joint Committee on Federal Relations from 1994 until 1999. He was the Chair of the Anne Arundel County Delegation from  1995 until 1999 and a member of the Southern Legislative Conference.  Finally, he was the Maryland Vice-Chair of the American Legislative Exchange Council (ALEC) from 1997 until 1999.

Since leaving his elected position, he has served as Director of the Maryland Area Regional Commuter (MARC) Train and Commuter Bus Service from 2004 until May 17, 2005. He was a Delegate to the Republican Party National Convention, 1992 and 1996. He was co-chair of the Anne Arundel County Bush/Quayle Campaign in 1992. He is a former member of the Anne Arundel County Republican Central Committee and current member of the Loch Haven Civic Association.  He is a past member of the Young Republicans of Anne Arundel County.

Bissett was the Republican nominee for County Executive in 2002, losing a close race to Janet S. Owens despite being outspent 6-to-1. Bissett served as Director of Maryland's MARC Train System under Governor Bob Ehrlich until May 17, 2005, when he stepped down. Bissett campaigned for a second try to be County Executive in 2006, again losing a close race to John Leopold by 1.65% of the vote.

Bissett has won several awards in his career including Legislator of the Year from the State's Attorneys' Association in 1994 and the Legislator of the Year from the Judiciary Committee of the Maryland Chamber of Commerce in 1997.

Election results
2002 election for Anne Arundel County Executive
Voters to choose one:
{| class="wikitable"
!Name
!Votes
!Percent
!Outcome
|-
|-
|-
|Janet S. Owens, Dem.
|89,456
|  51.8%
|   Won
|-
|-
|Phillip Bissett, Rep.
|83,305
|  48.2%
|   Lost
|}

1998 election for Maryland House of Delegates – District 30
Voters to choose three:
{| class="wikitable"
!Name
!Votes
!Percent
!Outcome
|-
|-
|-
|Michael E. Busch, Dem.
|24,075
|  21%
|   Won
|-
|-
|Virginia P. Clagett, Dem.
|24,036
|  21%
|   Won
|-
|-
|C. Richard D'Amato, Dem.
|20,223
|  18%
|   Won
|-
|-
|Phillip Bissett, Rep.
|18,690
|  16%
|   Lost
|-
|-
|Edward J. Turner, Rep.
|14,119
|  12%
|   Lost
|-
|-
|Anthony McConkey, Rep.
|12,353
|  11%
|   Lost
|}

1994 election for Maryland House of Delegates – District 30
Voters to choose three:
{| class="wikitable"
!Name
!Votes
!Percent
!Outcome
|-
|-
|-
|Michael E. Busch, Dem.
|18,709
|  19%
|   Won
|-
|-
|Phillip Bissett, Rep.
|18,009
|  23%
|   Won
|-
|-
|Virginia P. Clagett, Dem.
|18,254
|  18%
|   Won
|-
|-
|Ralph C. Rosacker, Rep.
|16,299
|  16%
|   Lost
|-
|-
|Joan Beck, Rep.
|15,974
|  16%
|   Lost
|-
|-
|John C. Eldridge Jr., Dem.
|13,320
|  13%
|   Lost
|}

1990 election for Maryland House of Delegates – District 30
Voters to choose three:
{| class="wikitable"
!Name
!Votes
!Percent
!Outcome
|-
|-
|John C. Astle, Dem.
|18,009
|  23%
|   Won
|-
|-
|Aris Allen, Rep.
|16,951
|  22%
|   Won
|-
|-
|Michael E. Busch, Dem.
|16,104
|  18%
|   Won
|-
|-
|Edith Segree, Dem.
|14,341
|  18%
|   Lost
|-
|-
|Phillip Bissett, Rep.
|13,321
|  17%
|   Lost
|}

References

External links

Bissett, Republican Party Look to 2006, Annapolis Capital, 1/16/2005

Republican Party members of the Maryland House of Delegates
People from Bethesda, Maryland
1956 births
Living people